Thyrotroph embryonic factor is a protein that in humans is encoded by the TEF gene.

Thyrotroph embryonic factor (TEF), a transcription factor, is a member of the PAR (proline and acidic amino acid-rich) subfamily of basic region/leucine zipper (bZIP) transcription factors.  It is expressed in a broad range of cells and tissues in adult animals, however, during embryonic development, TEF expression appears to be restricted to the developing anterior pituitary gland, coincident with the appearance of thyroid-stimulating hormone, beta (TSHB).  Indeed, TEF can bind to, and transactivate the TSHB promoter.  

It shows homology (in the functional domains) with other members of the PAR-bZIP subfamily of transcription factors, which include albumin D box-binding protein (DBP), human hepatic leukemia factor (HLF) and chicken vitellogenin gene-binding protein (VBP); VBP is considered the chicken homologue of TEF.  Different members of the subfamily can readily form heterodimers, and share DNA-binding, and transcriptional regulatory properties.

References

Further reading